William Hilton Hovell (26 April 1786 – 9 November 1875) was an English explorer of Australia.  With Hamilton Hume, he made an 1824 overland expedition from Sydney to Port Phillip (near the site of present-day Melbourne), and later explored the area around Western Port.

Early life
Hovell was born in Yarmouth, Norfolk, England. His father was captain and part owner of a vessel trading to the Mediterranean, which, during a voyage in 1794, was captured by the French and taken into a port, where he became a prisoner of war for two years. William, when only 10 years of age, went to sea to earn his living. After going through the hard life of a foremast hand, at 20 years of age he was mate of Zenobia bound to Peru, and two years later he was a mercantile marine captain of the Juno bound to Rio Janeiro, and others. He decided to come to Australia, arriving at Sydney New South Wales by the ship Earl Spencer, with his wife Esther née Arndell (daughter of the surgeon Thomas Arndell), and two children, a boy and a girl, on 9 October 1813. Making an association with Simeon Lord, Hovell became master of a vessel and made several trading voyages along the east coast of Australia coast and to New Zealand.

In June 1816, while in command of The Brothers he was shipwrecked in the Kent Group, Bass Strait, and along with his crew of eight survived for 10 weeks on the wheat from their cargo that was washed up, before being rescued by the Spring. In 1819 he settled on the land near Sydney and did some exploring in a southerly direction; he reached the Burragorang Valley in 1823.

Explorer

In 1824 Governor Sir Thomas Brisbane asked Hovell to join with Hamilton Hume to undertake the exploration of what is now southern New South Wales and Victoria in an attempt to obtain more information about any rivers that might run south in the direction of Spencer Gulf. Hovell had little bush experience, but had great experience as a navigator.

The planned official expedition did not eventuate, and Hume and Hovell decided to make the journey at their own expense. Some pack-saddles, clothes, blankets and arms were provided from the government stores. The explorers left on 3 October 1824 with six men. They reached Hume's station on 13 October, and on 17 October began the expedition proper with five bullocks, three horses and two carts. On 22 October they found that the only way to pass the Murrumbidgee River, then in flood, was to convert one of the carts into a type of boat by passing a tarpaulin under it; the men, horses, and bullocks swam over, and everything successfully got across. A day or two later, in broken hilly country full of water-courses, they had great difficulty in finding a road for the loaded carts, deciding on 27 October to abandon them. Until 16 November their course lay through difficult mountainous country. On that day they came to a large river which Hovell called Hume's River "he being the first that saw it". This was an upper reach of the Murray River so named by Charles Sturt a few years later. It was impossible to cross here, but after a few days a better place was found, and constructing the rough frame of a boat, they managed to get across. By 3 December they had reached the Goulburn River, which they were able to cross without a boat. 

Four days later impassable country was reached. The party spent three days attempting to cross the Great Dividing Range at Mt Disappointment but were thwarted. Hume shifted direction to the West then reached lower land at the future township of Broadford on the 12 December where they camped.
Hume headed towards low ranges to the South and found a pass in that direction next day. He led the party across the Dividing Range at Hume’s Pass, Wandong and on the 16th December, 1824 reached Port Phillip Bay at Bird Rock, Point Lillias adjacent to the future Geelong.
Hovell claimed that he measured their longitude on the same day but in reality he read it off the sketch map that they had drafted themselves during the trip.
Hovell admitted in 1867 that he did not take any longitude measurements and blamed Hume for it. 
Prior to this admission, Dr William Bland, who wrote the first book on the journey in 1831, invented the myth that Hovell made an error of one degree in longitude in order to protect him.
The party turned back towards New South Wales on the 18 December. Hume chose to travel more to the west to avoid the mountainous country and save considerable time. This was a sound decision. On 16 January 1825, just as their flour ran out, they reached the carts they had left behind them, and then two days later the safety of Hume's station at Gunning.

On 25 March 1825 Governor Brisbane mentioned the discoveries of Hovell and Hume in a dispatch and said that he intended to send a vessel to Western Port to have it explored. However, nothing was done until his successor, Governor Darling, towards the end of 1826, sent an expedition under Captain Wright to Western Port. Hovell was attached to this expedition, and when it arrived he saw that it was not the region that he had reached on his first trip. Hovell explored and reported on the land surrounding Western Port and to the north of it, and near the coast to the east at Cape Paterson he discovered "great quantities of very fine coal". This was the first discovery of coal in Victoria. Hovell was away five months on this expedition and afterwards did no more exploring. He appears to have had no success, but prospered on his pastoral run at Goulburn, where he lived for the rest of his life. He died on 9 November 1875, and in 1877 his widow left the substantial sum of £6000 to the University of Sydney as a memorial of him, which was used to found the William Hilton Hovell lectureship on geology and physical geography.

Late life
In 1854 ill-feeling arose between Hume and Hovell which led to each write public documents with contradicting claims on the conduct of their expedition. In December 1853 Hovell had been entertained at a public dinner in Geelong to celebrate the 29th anniversary of the discovery of the district. Reports reached Hume that Hovell was credited for the discovery of Geelong. The fullest report of Hovell's speech available does not justify Hume's contention.

Hovell died in Sydney on 9 November 1875 and was buried at Goulburn, survived by a son.

Honours

The road William Hovell Drive which connects the districts of Belconnen to North Canberra in Canberra, Australia is named after him.

In 1976 Hume and Hovell were honoured on a postage stamp bearing their portraits issued by Australia Post

Lake William Hovell on the King River is named after him.

William Hovell Drive, between Matthew Flinders Avenue and John Edgcumbe Way, in Endeavour Hills, Victoria, is named after him.

Hovells Creek near Geelong is named after him. The creek flows through the suburb of Lara, with its mouth at Limeburners Lagoon, flowing into Corio Bay from the north.

References

1786 births
1875 deaths
People from Great Yarmouth
Explorers of Australia
English explorers
Royal Navy officers